A jockey's cap is the headgear worn by a jockey in the sport of horse racing. The modern jockey's cap forms part of a jockey's "silks" or racing colours and is worn over a protective equestrian helmet.

History
The first form of jockey's cap appeared in the late 17th century and was generally made of velvet with a peak or visor and a hatband fastened at the front with a buckle. This early style of cap is preserved in the "State Dress" of the musicians of the Household Cavalry, who adopted it at the behest of Queen Victoria. During the 19th century, a lighter version began to be worn by racing jockeys; it was made of silk in the colours representing the jockey's stable. Modern jockey's caps are made oversized so that they can be worn over a protective helmet.

Gallery

References

Caps
History of clothing (Western fashion)
Sportswear